Amalasuintha (495 – 30 April 534/535) was a ruler of Ostrogothic Kingdom from 526 to 535. She ruled first as regent for her son Athalaric and thereafter as queen.  Amalasuintha was highly educated and was praised by both Cassiodorus, and Procopius for her wisdom and her ability to speak three languages, (Greek, Gothic, Latin).

Family 

Amalasuintha was likely born in Ravenna in 495, the only child of Theodoric and his wife Audofleda, the sister of Clovis, King of the Franks. The union of Amalasuintha’s parents were of a political purpose, as many royal marriages were at the time. Theodoric married Audofleda about the year 493, after he had defeated the various Gothic kingdoms and sought an alliance with the Franks. Amalasuintha was born into the Amali dynasty on her father’s side, which dynasty comprised Goths of Germanic descent. Like her father, Amalasuintha was married out of political reasons to Eutheric, an Amali prince, to ensure a legitimate heir to the throne. They had two children together, Athalaric and Matasuntha. Eutheric died in 522, causing Theodoric some alarm, as his kingdom lacked an adult male heir to inherit the throne. As Amalasuintha's son Athalaric was only 10 years old at the time of Theodoric's death, Amalasuintha took control of the kingdom alongside her son as regent and, although accounts by Cassiodorus and Procopius refer to Athalaric as King, she effectively ruled on his behalf.

Rule

Regent
After the death of her father in 526, Amalasuintha served alongside her son as a regent queen from 526 to 534, until Athalaric died from what was most likely the combination of excessive drinking, a part of Gothic culture, and the likelihood that he had diabetes. Although some sources refer to Athalaric as King, Amalasuintha ruled on his behalf, as a child of his age would be incapable of governing effectively. According to Procopius, the Goth aristocracy wanted Athalaric to be raised in the Gothic manner, but Amalasuintha wanted him to resemble the Roman princes. Amalasuintha had close ties to Justinian I, the emperor of the Byzantine Empire. Knowing how the Goth aristocrats viewed Amalasuintha’s Roman virtues and education, her ties to Justinian would have certainly made the nobles object to her rule even more. Before Athalaric grew up to the proper age, he became very ill. In order to secure the power in the Amali name, Amalasuintha created the consortium regni that allowed her to continue to rule as queen while still presenting a public face that honored conservative Gothic tradition. She then appointed her older cousin Theohadad to rule as co-regent, in which Amalasuintha would play the male character and Theohadad would play the woman, as male and female monarchs sharing powers. Masculinity is the main characteristic attributed to Amalasuintha by Procopius and Cassiodorus, because she had a strong determination and temperament. 
Her tremendous influence in her position as regent can be seen in a diptych of Rufius Gennadius Probus Orestes in which she appears alongside her son, Athalaric, in 530. Deeply imbued with the old Roman culture, she gave to her son's education a more refined and literary turn than suited her Goth subjects. Conscious of her unpopularity, she banished – and afterwards put to death – three Gothic nobles whom she suspected of conspiring against her rule. At the same time, she opened negotiations with the Byzantine emperor Justinian I, with the view of removing herself and the Gothic treasure to Constantinople.

Queen Regnant
After Athalaric's death, Amalasuintha became queen and ruled alone for a short while before making her cousin Theodahad co-ruler with the intent of strengthening her position.  Theodahad was a prominent leader of the Gothic military aristocracy that opposed her pro-Roman stances, and Amalasuintha believed this duumvirate might make supporters from her harshest critics. Instead Theodahad fostered the disaffection of the Goths, and either by his orders or with his permission, Amalasuintha was imprisoned on the island of Martana in Lake Bolsena, where on April 30th of 534/535 she was murdered in her bath.

Death

The death of Amalasuintha gave Justinian I a reason to go to war with the Ostrogoths and attempt to take Italy. According to the Eastern Roman historian Procopius, Amalasuintha was thinking about handing over Italy to Justinian around the time of her death. Shortly after Amalasuintha's murder, Theodahad was replaced by Witigis, Amalasuintha's son-in-law. With the people's support, Witigis had Theodahad put to death.

Sources 
The letters of Cassiodorus, chief minister and literary adviser of Amalasuintha, and the histories of Procopius and Jordanes, give us our chief information as to the character of Amalasuintha. Cassiodorus was a part of a greater pro-Roman party that desired to Romanize the traditional Ostrogothic kingship, further evidence of the pro-Roman circle that Amalasuintha surrounded herself with.

Legacy

The life of Amalasuintha was made the subject of a tragedy, the first play written by the young Carlo Goldoni and presented at Milan in 1733.

Romanian poet George Coșbuc wrote a poem entitled Regina Ostrogotilor (The Queen of the Ostrogoths) in which Amalasuintha (named Amalasunda in the poem) speaks to Theodahad (mentioned as  Teodat in the poem) shortly before he kills her.

Asteroid 650 Amalasuntha is named in her honour.

Amalasuintha is portrayed by Honor Blackman in the 1968 film Kampf um Rom.

References

Further reading
Craddock, Jonathan Paul. Amalasuintha: Ostrogothic Successor, A.D. 526–535. PhD diss. California State University, Long Beach, 1996.
Vitiello, Massimiliano. Amalasuintha: The Transformation of Queenship in the Post-Roman World. University of Pennsylvania Press, 2018.

Year of birth unknown
535 deaths
6th-century women rulers
Ostrogothic queens consort
Ostrogothic kings
Amali dynasty
6th-century monarchs in Europe
6th-century murdered monarchs
6th-century Ostrogothic people
6th-century Italian women
6th-century Christians 
6th-century scholars 
Women scholars and academics
Scholars of Latin literature
Scholars of Greek language
Queens regnant in Europe
6th-century kings of Italy